MISBHV (pronounced "misbehave") is a Polish streetwear label established by Natalia Maczek in 2014. It is based in Warsaw and has around 90 retailers worldwide.

Background and history 
In 2008, Natalia Maczek was studying law at the Jagiellonian University in Krakow. Maczek discovered fashion during a stay in London where she worked a few summer jobs. Back in Poland, she launched a side project along with her partner Tomek Wirski, a DJ. The two started making fake designer t-shirts for their friends to wear at clubs.

In January 2015, Maczek and Wirski gave their first fashion show at a tiny showroom in Paris. Some of their first customers were MARGIELA, GR8, Antonioli and BROWNS. Later that year, MISBHV was included in New York Fashion Week, where it debuted its Spring/Summer 2017 collection, inspired by David Bowie who had died earlier that year, with quotes from his 70s songs scattered across many products from t-shirts to leather jackets.

In the same year, Rihanna work a Matrix-black MISBHV jacket during her a performance in London.

MISBHV put together its first runway presentation, "Polish Jazz", at Warsaw's Palace of Culture and Science to debut its Spring/Summer 2019 collection. For the show, Maczek and Wirski paid tribute to Poland, referencing 1966 Warsaw poster art and collaborating with Polish artist Roslaw Szaybo.

The name "MISBHV" is inspired by a record store Maczek used to visit when she was eighteen.

The brand has its headquarters in a studio in Krakow's Zabłocie district, in the former "Telpod" cable factory.

Influences 
Emerging from Warsaw’s techno-punk scene, Maczek and Thomas are always interested in exploring the intersection of fashion and the underground, with music playing a key role in every creative endeavor. The brand's aesthetic is rooted in the hip-hop and club scenes of post-socialist Poland, and infused with a DIY sensibility The duo cite a uniquely European perspective on rave and club culture, memories of their youth in post-socialist Poland, the disco trend of the 1990s and the raw style of motorcyclists as their most significant influences.

The duo are inspired by multiple artists including the early works of Jean Arp when creating their signature camouflage, Andy Warhol when working on prints, and the color palette of Paul Cezanne.

Pop culture 
In 2020, MISBHV was the first fashion label featured on Grand Theft Auto.

See also 

 Streetwear

References 

Clothing companies established in 2014
Street fashion
Clothing companies of Poland
2014 establishments in Poland
Companies based in Warsaw